Rhipidita is a genus of fungus gnats in the family Ditomyiidae.

Species
R. fusca Edwards, 1940
R. nigra Lane, 1952
R. pectinata (Lane, 1946)

References

Ditomyiidae
Sciaroidea genera